Sir Alexander Kirkland Cairncross  (11 February 1911 – 21 October 1998) was a British economist. He was the brother of the spy John Cairncross and father of journalist Frances Cairncross and public health engineer and epidemiologist Sandy Cairncross.

Life

Cairncross was born in Lesmahagow, Lanarkshire, the seventh of eight children of Alexander Kirkland Cairncross, an ironmonger. He was educated at Lesmahagow Higher Grade School and Hamilton Academy, then won two scholarships to study economics at Glasgow University. From there, he attained a further research studentship to study at Trinity College, Cambridge, and in 1935 he was awarded the second PhD in economics bestowed by the university.

He became a lecturer in economics, under the influence of John Maynard Keynes (author of The General Theory of Employment, Interest and Money and one of the leading lights of the 1944 Bretton Woods Conference, which saw the founding of the World Bank and the International Monetary Fund). During World War II, most of his work was in the Ministry of Aircraft Production, where he rose to become Director of Programmes. In 1946 he served briefly on the staff of The Economist, and subsequently became adviser to the Board of Trade. He was seconded to be the economic adviser to the Organisation for European Economic Co-operation in Paris in 1949. and he left to become Professor of Applied Economics at his old university, Glasgow, in 1951.

Cairncross was instrumental in founding the Scottish Economic Society and was, in 1954, the first editor of its Scottish Journal of Political Economy. Cairncross served as an economic adviser to the UK government (1961–64), Head of the Government Economic Service (1964–69) and Master of St Peter's College, Oxford (1969–78), Chancellor of the University of Glasgow (1972–96), and was an Honorary Fellow of the Royal Society of Edinburgh. At Guildhall, Swansea he gave the Presidential Address as President of the British Association for 1970–1971. Cairncross was made a Fellow of the British Academy in 1961. Cairncross also received an Honorary Doctorate from Heriot-Watt University in 1969, and in 1992 was elected an Honorary Fellow of the Royal Society of Edinburgh.

In 1970 he was invited to deliver the MacMillan Memorial Lecture to the Institution of Engineers and Shipbuilders in Scotland. He chose the subject "Economic Growth".

Recognition

The Scottish Economic Society instituted the Cairncross Prize in his memory.

Family and death

Cairncross married Mary Frances Glynn in 1943; the couple had five children: two daughters and three sons. He died in Oxford on 21 October 1998.

Publications

 Introduction to Economics (1944, 1st ed.; 1973, 5th ed.)
Home and Foreign Investment, 1870-1913 (1953)
Monetary Policy in a Mixed Economy (1960)
Economic Development and the Atlantic Provinces (1961)
Essays in Economic Management (1962)
Control over Long-Term Capital Movements (1973)
Britain's Economics Prospects Reconsidered, ed. (1971)
Years of Recovery: British Economic Policy 1945-51 (1985)
'Goodbye, Great Britain': The 1976 IMF Crisis (1992) (with Kathleen Burk)

References

External links
 Biography at World Bank archives

1911 births
1998 deaths
People from Lesmahagow
Scottish economists
Presidents of the Girls' Day School Trust
People educated at Hamilton Academy
Alumni of the University of Glasgow
Alumni of Trinity College, Cambridge
Academics of the University of Glasgow
Chancellors of the University of Glasgow
Masters of St Peter's College, Oxford
Academic journal editors
Fellows of the Royal Society of Edinburgh
Scottish knights
Knights Commander of the Order of St Michael and St George
Fellows of the British Academy
20th-century British economists
Social Democratic Party (UK) politicians